Royal Air Force Fairford or more simply RAF Fairford  is a Royal Air Force (RAF) station in Gloucestershire, England which is currently a standby airfield and therefore not in everyday use. Its most prominent use in recent years has been as an airfield for United States Air Force B-52s during the 2003 Iraq War, Operation Allied Force in 1999, and the first Gulf War in 1991. It is the US Air Force's only European airfield for heavy bombers.

RAF Fairford was the only TransOceanic Abort Landing site for NASA's Space Shuttle in the UK. The runway is rated with an unrestricted load-bearing capacity, meaning that it can support any aircraft with any type of load.

RAF Fairford is also the home of the Royal International Air Tattoo (RIAT), an annual air display. RIAT is one of the largest airshows in the world, with the 2003 show recognised by Guinness World Records as the largest military airshow ever, with an attendance of 535 aircraft.

History

Second World War

Construction started in 1943 as part of a programme to open fourteen airfields in southern England to be used by British and American troop carrier transports and gliders. The station opened on 18 January 1944. Initially intended to be operated by the United States forces, the first occupants arrived on 18 March when the Royal Air Force's No.620 Squadron equipped with the Short Stirling Mk.IV moved from RAF Leicester East, soon to be accompanied on 25 March by No. 190 Squadron also operating the Stirling. The aircraft were used for airborne forces operations, performing parachute drops of troops & supplies and towing Airspeed Horsa assault gliders. Troop carriers and gliders from Fairford were used for the D-Day invasion of Normandy. The RAF used it to lift British troops for Operation Market Garden.

Cold War 
In the early years of the Cold War the British and American governments reached an agreement under which elements of the USAF Strategic Air Command (SAC) would be based in the UK. Bases had already been established in East Anglia, at RAF Mildenhall and RAF Lakenheath, but they were considered to be vulnerable to bomber attack and airfields further behind the RAF fighter defences were sought. Four RAF airfields were selected to receive SAC units: RAF Brize Norton, RAF Fairford, RAF Greenham Common and RAF Upper Heyford. In 1948 the Americans occupied RAF stations including Fairford, Brize Norton, Burtonwood, Greenham Common, Mildenhall, Lakenheath and Woodbridge to build up a deterrent in Europe against the Soviets.
 RAF Lyneham's position as the primary tactical transport base for the RAF was emphasised in February 1971 when Nos. 30 and 47 Squadrons were transferred from their old base at RAF Fairford. In 1965, RAF Fairford was the first home base of the Royal Air Force Aerobatic Team The Red Arrows.

In 1950, as a result of the beginning of the Cold War, the airfield was transferred to the United States Air Force for strategic bomber operations. A  runway was constructed for long-range bomber operations.

The runway was completed in 1953, and served as a forward airbase for the first Convair B-36 Peacemaker aircraft from Carswell Air Force Base, Texas. The airfield later received B-47s which were maintained at a heightened state of alert because of increased tensions with the Soviet Union.

Due to the long runway Fairford was chosen in 1969 as the British test centre for the Concorde aircraft until 1977.

The U.S. Air Force returned with Boeing KC-135 Stratotankers deployed on rotation from the many KC-135 bases in the USA. On 15 November 1978 the 11th Strategic Group (11 SG) was activated at RAF Fairford.  It was not manned until the following February and used KC-135 aircraft and crews from SAC, Air National Guard, and AF Reserve units until the 11 SG received its own aircraft in September 1979. It soon began aerial refueling support for all USAF operations, deployments and redeployments, as well as participating in NATO exercises.

Operations staff and maintenance personnel were permanently assigned, but aircraft, aircrews and crew chiefs were temporarily assigned to the 11th Strategic Group for the European Tanker Task Force on rotation.  Aircraft and crews operated from Riyadh, Saudi Arabia; Keflavik, Iceland; Zaragosa, Spain; Lajes Field, Azores; Sigonella NAS, Italy; and Hellenikon, Greece. The unit retained the 11th Strategic Group designation, but was inactivated on 7 August 1990.

KC-135 and KC-10 tankers deployed to Fairford supported Operation El Dorado Canyon against Libya in 1986. The KC-135s and KC-10s were withdrawn in 1990 and the station was returned to standby status, upgraded to 'limited use' in the mid-1990s.

Due to RAF Fairford's location and infrastructure, the airfield is designated as a forward operating location for the US Air Force. It was used in the first Gulf War in 1991, with B-52s and KC-135s from Eaker AFB in Arkansas. It was later used during Operation Allied Force in 1999 when B-52s from Barksdale AFB, B-1Bs from Ellsworth AFB and KC-135s from Mountain Home AFB were used.

21st century 

In the 2003 Iraq War, Operation Iraqi Freedom included B-52s based at Minot AFB but flying from Fairford. In recent years the airfield has been occasionally used by American B-2 Spirit stealth bombers and is frequently visited by U-2 aircraft.

Due to the deteriorating airfield facilities and its unique NATO heavy bomber mission, RAF Fairford underwent a $100 million upgrade of its runway and fuel systems in the largest NATO funded airfield construction project within a NATO country since the end of the Cold War. This work lasted from May 2000 through May 2002. Additional improvements continued until 2008, including the construction of two climate-controlled hangars for B-2 stealth bombers and a low-observability maintenance dock.

On 14 January 2004, the 420th Air Base Group (420 ABG) was established at RAF Fairford to improve the control of its geographically separated units (GSUs) that had been aligned beneath the 100th Air Refueling Wing at RAF Mildenhall. These units are assigned to airfields at RAF Fairford, RAF Croughton, RAF Alconbury, and RAF Molesworth. The 420 ABG reported directly to Third Air Force until 26 May 2004, when the 38th Combat Support Wing (38 CSW) was established at Sembach Annex, Germany.

On 12 May 2005, USAFE activated the 501st Combat Support Wing, with headquarters at RAF Alconbury, to provide support to its GSUs in the United Kingdom.

In 2010 USAF withdrew all its uniformed staff from the station by September 2010 leaving a civilian operating unit to maintain the base on a "care and maintenance" basis. However the base remains a designated standby airfield for heavy bomber operations, capable of immediate reactivation within 24–48 hours and it continues to host the Royal International Air Tattoo every July.

In September 2014 Fairford was used as the staging base for US President Obama's trip to the NATO conference held in Newport, Wales.  VC-25A "Air Force 1" (AF1) aircraft carrying the President and his entourage and support aircraft arrived on 3 September, the US Secretary of State John Kerry also arrived in his own USAF C-32 aircraft.  Air Force One with President Obama departed for Washington 5 September after an 'impromptu' visit to Stonehenge on his way from Newport back to RAF Fairford.

Since June 2014 RAF Fairford has seen regular heavy bomber exercises return with B-52H, B-2A and in September 2016, B-1B aircraft for short duration exercises by Air Force Global Strike Command and US Air Force Reserve units from Barksdale, Minot, Whiteman and Dyess Air Force Bases.  These exercises include participation in NATO exercises Baltops, Saber Strike and Ample Strike. Baltops, mainly a maritime exercise, takes place off the Baltic States of Estonia, Latvia and Lithuania, while Saber Strike saw the B-52s flying close air support missions in Poland. Taking advantage of B-52 deployment in 2014 were two flights of two B-2 Spirits, which made brief visits to Fairford as part of Global Power training flights. The Ample Strike exercise in September 2016 was the first time that US Air Force Reserve had deployed two types of heavy bombers (B-1Bs and B-52Hs) under the same parent operating Wing (307BW). March 2019 saw the largest deployment of B-52Hs to RAF Fairford since Operation Iraqi Freedom in 2003, when six bombers arrived from the 2nd Bomb Wing.

In November 2018, it was announced that the 95th Reconnaissance Squadron and 488th Intelligence Squadron would relocate to Fairford by 2024. The squadrons, based at RAF Mildenhall in Suffolk, are both part of the 55th Operations Group and support Boeing RC-135 surveillance aircraft when forward deployed on temporary duty to the UK from the United States. The move, part of the US Department of Defense's European Infrastructure Consolidation programme, was expected to see 500 personnel and RC-135 operations transfer to Fairford. However, in December the proposal was cancelled and it was confirmed that Mildenhall would be retained as the RC-135's UK operating location.

On 22 August 2020, six B-52H bombers from the 23rd Bomb Squadron, 5th Bomb Wing, Minot AFB deployed to RAF Fairford for a series of exercises with NATO and allied countries. On 28 August 2020, in a single-day mission dubbed 'Allied Sky', B52s overflew all 30 NATO countries; four of the six B-52s deployed at RAF Fairford flew the European portion whilst two Minot-based B52s flew over the United States and Canada.

In February 2022, four B-52 bombers from the 69th Bomb Squadron were deployed to RAF Fairford for 6 weeks.

Role and operations 

RAF Fairford is a Forward Operating Location made available to the United States by the UK Government. It is the only bomber forward operating location in Europe and is predominately used by US Air Force deployments of the B-1B Lancer, B-2A Spirit and B-52H Stratofortress aircraft taking part in Air Force Global Strike Command's Bomber Task Force missions.

Since October 2019 the base has been hosting US Air Force's U-2S Dragon Lady reconnaissance aircraft, operated by the 99th Expeditionary Reconnaissance Squadron.

Base and mission support is provided by the 420th Air Base Squadron, a Geographically Separate Unit of the 501st Combat Support Wing based at RAF Alconbury in Cambridgeshire.

Based units
Notable units based at RAF Fairford.

United States Air Force 
United States Air Forces in Europe - Air Forces Africa (USAFE-AFAFRICA)

 501st Combat Support Wing
 422nd Air Base Group 
 420th Air Base Squadron
 420th Munitions Squadron
Air Combat Command (ACC)

 Sixteenth Air Force
 9th Reconnaissance Wing
 9th Operations Group
 99th Expeditionary Reconnaissance Squadron – U-2S Dragon Lady

Royal International Air Tattoo 

The Royal International Air Tattoo (RIAT), the world's largest military air show, is held annually at Fairford over the third weekend in July. RIAT is held in support of The Royal Air Force Charitable Trust and has attracted an attendance of up to 185,000 spectators over the weekend, with several hundred military aircraft belonging to air-arms from around the world taking part in static and flying displays.

Former RAF Fairford unit emblems

See also
 List of Royal Air Force stations
 United States Air Forces in Europe
 United States Air Force in the United Kingdom
 Strategic Air Command in the United Kingdom

References

Citations

Bibliography
 Maurer, Maurer. Air Force Combat Units of World War II. Washington, DC: U.S. Government Printing Office 1961 (republished 1983, Office of Air Force History).
 Ravenstein, Charles A. Air Force Combat Wings Lineage and Honors Histories 1947–1977. Maxwell Air Force Base, Alabama: Office of Air Force History 1984. .
 Fletcher, Harry R. (1989) Air Force Bases Volume II, Active Air Force Bases outside the United States of America on 17 September 1982. Maxwell AFB, Alabama: Office of Air Force History.

External links

 501st Combat Support Wing

 UK Military Aeronautical Information Publication – Fairford (EGVA)

 History of RAF Fairford

Royal Air Force stations in Gloucestershire
Installations of the United States Air Force in the United Kingdom
Installations of Strategic Air Command
1943 establishments in England
RAF
Military airbases established in 1943
Space Shuttle Emergency Landing Sites